Nuno Miguel Oliveira Borges (born 31 March 1988) is a Cape Verdean professional footballer who plays as a midfielder.

Club career
Borges rejoined his youth club Farense on 29 January 2018, as a late reinforcement.

International career
Borges made his debut for the Cape Verde national football team in a 0-0 (4-3) penalty shootout win over Andorra on 3 June 2018.
He was named in the roster for the 2021 Africa cup of nations  2021 when the team reached the round of 16..

References

External links
 
 
 FPF Profile
 

1988 births
Living people
People from Sintra
Cape Verdean footballers
Cape Verde international footballers
Portuguese footballers
Portuguese sportspeople of Cape Verdean descent
Citizens of Cape Verde through descent
Association football midfielders
S.C. Farense players
C.D. Nacional players
Casa Pia A.C. players
Primeira Liga players
Liga Portugal 2 players
Campeonato de Portugal (league) players
2021 Africa Cup of Nations players